W Hong Kong, a W Hotel, is a five-star hotel in Hong Kong, that occupies the first 25 floors of the Sun Hung Kai Properties-owned Cullinan II, Kowloon station, West Kowloon, offering a total of 393 guest rooms, as well as a rooftop swimming pool, 'WooBar', and a number of unique features especially for guests, including a complimentary local mobile phone for each guest to use during their stay. The W Hong Kong started trial operations on 8 August 2008, and official operations in January 2009.

See also
 W Hotels
 Marriott International
 Airport Express (MTR)
 Elements, Hong Kong
 The Cullinan
 The Ritz-Carlton, Hong Kong
 Union Square (Hong Kong)
 Sun Hung Kai Properties
 Hong Kong International Airport
 Kowloon station (MTR)

References

External links

 
 

Hotels in Hong Kong
Hotel buildings completed in 2008
West Kowloon
Sun Hung Kai Properties
Hong Kong
2008 establishments in Hong Kong